Depressipoma kwajaleina is a species of small sea snail with calcareous opercula, a marine gastropod mollusc in the family Colloniidae.

Description
The shell grows to a height of 3.2 mm.

Distribution
This marine species occurs in the Pacific Ocean off the Kwajalein Atoll, Marshall Islands.

References

External links
 To World Register of Marine Species
 

Colloniidae
Gastropods described in 2012